José Martin Meolans (born June 22, 1978 in Córdoba) is a freestyle swimmer from Argentina, who won the world title in the 50 metre freestyle at the 2002 FINA Short Course World Championships in Moscow, Russia.

A year later he won 100m freestyle at the 2003 Pan American Games. Meolans, a member of the swimming team at the Club Atlético River Plate, is trained by Orlando Moccagatta. He competed in three consecutive Summer Olympics for his native country, starting in 1996.

In the 24th International Championship held on 2006 in Porto, Portugal, he won two gold medals in freestyle: 50 metres (23.14 sec) and 100 (50.66 sec). He also finished third at the  2006 FINA Short Course World Championships in 100 metre freestyle.

See also
 Argentine records in swimming
 South American records in swimming

References

External links
 

1978 births
Living people
Sportspeople from Córdoba, Argentina
Argentine male freestyle swimmers
Pan American Games gold medalists for Argentina
Argentine male swimmers
Olympic swimmers of Argentina
Swimmers at the 1995 Pan American Games
Swimmers at the 1996 Summer Olympics
Swimmers at the 1999 Pan American Games
Swimmers at the 2000 Summer Olympics
Swimmers at the 2003 Pan American Games
Swimmers at the 2004 Summer Olympics
Swimmers at the 2007 Pan American Games
Swimmers at the 2008 Summer Olympics
Medalists at the FINA World Swimming Championships (25 m)
Pan American Games silver medalists for Argentina
Pan American Games bronze medalists for Argentina
Pan American Games medalists in swimming
Goodwill Games medalists in swimming
South American Games gold medalists for Argentina
South American Games medalists in swimming
Competitors at the 2006 South American Games
Competitors at the 2001 Goodwill Games
Medalists at the 1999 Pan American Games
Medalists at the 2003 Pan American Games
Medalists at the 2007 Pan American Games
21st-century Argentine people